Our Lady of Good Success (Spanish: Nuestra Señora de la Buena Suerte) is a Catholic Marian title associated with Marian images located in the Spanish cities of Granada and Zaragoza, the island of La Gomera, and the region of Catalonia. The seaside location of many of these images suggests that Spanish sailors would invoke Mary under this title specifically to petition for safe voyages.

Conflation with Buen Suceso

Among English speakers, this title (Buena Suerte) is often confused with a similar title, Nuestra Señora del Buen Suceso (meaning Our Lady of the Good Event), due to the superficial similarity between "success" in English and "suceso" in Spanish. The Buen Suceso title, however, refers specifically to the "good event" of the Purification of Mary and the Presentation of Jesus.

References

Good Success